The 2020–21 Angolan Basketball League was the 43rd season of the Angolan Basketball League, the highest premier basketball league in Angola. It was the first season after the previous season was cancelled due to the COVID-19 pandemic. Petro de Luanda won its 14th championship.

Teams
Jesus Cristo and the second teams of Petro de Luanda and Primeiro de Agosto entered the league for the first time.
<onlyinclude>{| class="wikitable sortable"  
|-
! Club
! Location
! Venue
! Capacity
|-
| ASA || Luanda || Pavilhão da Cidadela || align=center|
|-
| Jesus Cristo || || ||
|-
| Interclube || Luanda || Pavilhão 28 de Fevereiro || align=center|
|-
| Marinha || Luanda || Pavilhão Victorino Cunha || align=center|
|-
| Petro de Luanda || Luanda || Pavilhão da Cidadela ||  align=center| 
|-
| Petro de Luanda B || Luanda || Pavilhão da Cidadela ||  align=center| 
|-
| Primeiro de Agosto || Luanda || Pavilhão Victorino Cunha || align=center| 
|-
| Primeiro de Agosto B || Luanda || Pavilhão Victorino Cunha || align=center| 
|-
|  Universidade Lusíada || Luanda || Pavilhão Anexo || align=center|
|-
|  Vila Clotilde || Luanda || Pavilhão Anexo || align=center|
|-
| Kwanza || Luanda || Pavilhão Victorino Cunha || align=center| 
|}

Regular season

Playoffs

Bracket

Semifinals
The semifinals were played on 13 April, 15 April and 17 April 2022.

|}

Finals
The finals were played on 20 April, 22 April and 24 April 2022.

|}

Individual awards

Statistics

References

External links
AfroBasket season page

Angolan Basketball League seasons
Angola